The Legislature of Saskatchewan is made of two elements: the lieutenant governor as representative of the King, and the unicameral assembly called the Legislative Assembly. The legislature has existed since Saskatchewan was formed out of part of the North-West Territories in 1905.

Like the Canadian federal government, Saskatchewan uses a Westminster-style parliamentary government, in which members are sent to the Legislative Assembly after general elections and from there the party with the most seats chooses a premier and Executive Council.  The premier is Saskatchewan's head of government, while the lieutenant governor represents the Canadian head of state, the King.

List of legislatures
Following is a list of the 29 times the legislature has been convened since 1905. For previous legislatures, see List of Northwest Territories Legislative Assemblies.

Notes:

References